The 2020–21 season was the first season Harrogate Town played in the Football League following their promotion from the National League in the previous season. They competed in League Two, the fourth tier of English football, alongside the FA Cup, EFL Cup, and EFL Trophy. The club began the season at the Keepmoat Stadium in Doncaster, South Yorkshire, whilst a grass pitch was installed at their traditional Wetherby Road stadium in Harrogate, North Yorkshire.

Background

The 2019–20 season saw Harrogate Town finish second in the National League, and thus qualified for the play-offs. They defeated Boreham Wood 1–0 in the semi-final, before a 3–1 victory over Notts County in the final secured Harrogate's promotion to the Football League for the first time in their history.

Since the EFL require all matches to be played on grass pitches, the club played all their home matches for the first month of the season at Doncaster Rovers' Keepmoat Stadium whilst the club replaced their synthetic pitch at Wetherby Road.

At the end of June 2020, defenders Maxim Kouogun, George Smith and Matty Taylor were all released following the expiry of their contracts, whilst the contract of midfielder Sam Jones was terminated with immediate effect.

Transfers

Transfers in

Loans in

Loans out

Transfers out

Friendly matches

Competitions

League Two

League table

Results summary

Results by round

Matches
The League Two fixtures were announced on 21 August 2020, with Harrogate's first fixture being away to Southend United.

FA Cup

The draw for the first round was made on 26 October. The second round draw was revealed on Monday, 9 November by Danny Cowley.

EFL Cup

The first round draw was made live on Sky Sports on 18 August 2020, with Harrogate being drawn away to fellow League Two side Tranmere Rovers, with the match set to be played on 5 September 2020. The draw for both the second and third round were confirmed on September 6, live on Sky Sports by Phil Babb.

EFL Trophy

The regional group stage draw was confirmed on 18 August.

Statistics

Appearances and goals

Last updated 9 May 2021.

|-
! colspan=14 style=background:#dcdcdc; text-align:center| Goalkeepers

|-

! colspan=14 style=background:#dcdcdc; text-align:center| Defenders

|-

! colspan=14 style=background:#dcdcdc; text-align:center| Midfielders

|-

! colspan=14 style=background:#dcdcdc; text-align:center| Forwards

|}

Top scorers
Includes all competitive matches. The list is sorted by squad number when total goals are equal.

Last updated 9 May 2021.

Cleansheets
Includes all competitive matches. The list is sorted by squad number when total cleansheets are equal.

Last updated 9 May 2021.

Disciplinary record
Includes all competitive matches.

Last updated 9 May 2021.

Notes

References

Harrogate Town A.F.C. seasons
Harrogate Town